is a junior college in Tokyo, Japan, and is part of the Teisei Gakuen network.

The institute was founded in 1930 by Maki Takahashi, developed as a Junior College in 2009.

External links
 Teisei Gakuen Junior College

Educational institutions established in 1930
Japanese junior colleges
1930 establishments in Japan
Universities and colleges in Tokyo